PSS Społem is a Polish consumers' co-operative of local grocery stores founded in 1868.

Each of the branches of PSS Społem during the Partitions of Poland were formed via different conditions in law, economy and politics. The common character of the consumers' co-operative was patriotism, providing economic and political security against the Partition Powers of Kingdom of Prussia, Habsburg Austria and the Russian Empire. The year 1869 saw the formation of the first consumer co-operatives: Merkury in Warsaw, Oszczędność in Radom, and Zgoda in Płock. The idea behind the name of the co-operative chain was Stefan Żeromski, who published the first fortnightly journal propagating the need for co-operation, published in 1906.

During the Polish People's Republic, PSS Społem built a number of modernist grocery stores, inter alia in: Spółdzielczy Dom Handlowy Zenit in Katowice (1962), SDH Central in Łódź (1972), SDH Skarbek in Katowice (1975).

Gallery

References

Food and drink companies of Poland
Business services companies established in 1868
Retail companies established in 1868
Supermarkets of Poland
Polish brands